Andrea Kdolsky (née Pelucha, born 2 November 1962) is an Austrian physician and retired politician (Non-party, until 2023 ÖVP) who was Minister for Health, Family and Youth in the Gusenbauer government.

Kdolsky was born and grew up in Vienna. She originally began studying law and economics, but ultimately completed a Doctor of Medicine in 1993 at the University of Vienna. She subsequently worked as an anaesthesiologist.

From 11 January 2007 to 2 December 2008 Kdolsky was Minister for Health, Family and Youth in the cabinet of Alfred Gusenbauer. She was ÖVP Minister. 

After retirement from politics she became a consultant on health care.

Andrea Kdolsky is a former member of the Austrian People's Party. In March 2023 she left the party after a state government was formed from the ÖVP and the FPÖ in Lower Austria after the state elections in January 2023. She rejects the FPÖ under state party leader Udo Landbauer.

Publications

References

External links 
 

1962 births
Living people
Physicians from Vienna
Government ministers of Austria
Austrian people of Czech descent
Women government ministers of Austria
University of Vienna alumni
21st-century Austrian politicians
21st-century Austrian women politicians
Politicians from Vienna